The Tаrnovo Patriarchate was the name of an independent Bulgarian Orthodox Church in the period of 1235–1393.

History 
After the Vlach brothers Ivan Asen I and Peter IV reestablished the Bulgarian Empire in 1185 they took steps to restore the autocephalous Bulgarian church. As a result of the successful uprising of the brothers Peter IV and Ivan Asen I in 1185/1186, the foundations of the Second Bulgarian Empire were laid with Tarnovo as its capital. Following Boris I’s principle that the sovereignty of the state is inextricably linked to the autocephaly of the Church, the two brothers immediately took steps to restore the Bulgarian Patriarchate. As a start, they established an independent archbishopric in Tarnovo in 1186. The struggle to have the archbishopric recognized according to the canonical order and elevated to the rank of a Patriarchate took almost 50 years.

Since the recognition of an independent church by Patriarch of Constantinople was impossible, the Bulgarians temporarily concluded a Union with the Roman Catholic Church until 1235, when following the Church Council in Lampsak the Patriarchate of Tarnovo was recognized as an independent Patriarchate with its seat in the capital Tarnovo. The first Patriarch of Tаrnovo was Joachim I of Bulgaria. The last Patriarch to reside in Tarnovo was Euthymius of Tarnovo who was sent into exile by the Ottomans after they seized the Bulgarian capital in 1393.

In 1394, the Holy Synod of the Ecumenical Patriarchate gave the authorisation to the Metropolitan of Moldavia, Jeremiah, "to move with the help of God to the holy Church of Turnovo and to be allowed to perform everything befitting a prelate freely and without restraint." By around 1416, the territory of the Patriarchate of Turnovo was totally subordinated to the Ecumenical Patriarchate.

Bulgarian Patriarchs of Tarnovo

References 

1235 establishments in Europe
1393 disestablishments in Europe
Culture in Veliko Tarnovo
History of Veliko Tarnovo
Bulgarian Orthodox Church
Second Bulgarian Empire